All About Sex is an American talk show that premiered on TLC on January 10, 2015. The show is hosted by several panelists discussing human sexuality.

The panel consists of Margaret Cho, Heather McDonald, Marissa Jaret Winokur and Tiffanie Davis Henry.

References

External links
 
 
 

2010s American television talk shows
2015 American television series debuts
2015 American television series endings
English-language television shows
Sex education television series
TLC (TV network) original programming